Gabriel Matthew Leung   (born 6 November 1972) is the Executive Director (Charities and Community) of the Hong Kong Jockey Club. From 2013 to 2022, he was the longest-serving Dean of Medicine at the University of Hong Kong, where he was also the inaugural Helen and Francis Zimmern Professor in Population Health. Formerly, he was Hong Kong's first Under Secretary for Food and Health and fifth Director of the Office of the Chief Executive at the Government of Hong Kong.

Early life and education 
Leung was born in Hong Kong and studied at Wah Yan College. His maternal grandfather was British. He continued his education at Stonyhurst College in Lancashire, England (1986-1989) and Crescent School in Canada (1990). His family moved to Canada when he was 13 in Form 2 (equivalent to Year Eight in England, Wales, Australia and New Zealand), due to his father's job with a multinational company,

Leung undertook his undergraduate education at the University of Western Ontario, majoring in chemistry and minoring music. He then entered the medical school at same university, initially majoring in neurosurgery, eventually switching to public health and completed his family medicine residency training at the University of Toronto. He then received his Master's of Public Health degree from Harvard University in 1999, and earned a research doctorate (Doctor of Medicine) at the University of Hong Kong.

Career 
In 1999, Leung joined the University of Hong Kong (HKU) Faculty of Medicine (now the Li Ka Shing Faculty of Medicine) as an assistant professor in the Department of Community Medicine (now part of the School of Public Health), and became an associate professor when the School of Public Health was formed in 2004. During the SARS outbreak, he established and directed the Infectious Disease Epidemiology Group.

He was a Takemi Fellow at Harvard University from 2004 to 2005, and, after returning to Hong Kong, expanded the Children of 1997 study together with Catherine Mary Schooling, which followed "the majority of all babies born in Hong Kong during April and May 1997", into a life-course epidemiological study.

Leung was promoted to full professor in 2006 at the age of 33, one of the youngest in HKU's history. He also served as the Vice President and Censor in Public Health Medicine at the Hong Kong College of Community Medicine from 2006 to 2008.

In 2008, Leung left academia and joined the Government of Hong Kong as the first Under Secretary for Food and Health, during which he led the government's response in the 2009 swine flu H1N1 pandemic. He held the position until 2011 when he was appointed the Director of the Office of the Hong Kong Chief Executive.

When his term at the government ended, Leung returned to HKU in 2012 as the head of the Department of Community Medicine until 2013, when the department was incorporated into the School of Public Health, and the inaugural Master of Chi Sun College. He was also the acting director of the School of Public Health during this period.

In 2013, Leung was appointed as the 40th Dean of the HKU Li Ka Shing Faculty of Medicine and Chair Professor of Public Health. At the age of 40, he was the second youngest dean ever appointed at the HKU medical faculty.

During his deanship, the Faculty of Medicine launched the Springboard Scholarships and Second Chance Scholarship schemes to recruit students from more diverse backgrounds. A number of major changes to the faculty as a whole also took place under Leung's watch, including:

 Amalgamation of Departments of Anatomy, Biochemistry and Physiology into the School of Biomedical Sciences (2015)
 Establishment of the Emergency Medicine Unit (2015) (converted into the Department of Emergency Medicine in 2022)
 Expansion of the HKU Health System to include Gleneagles Hong Kong Hospital as the fourth teaching hospital (2017)
 Introduction of enrichment year in the Bachelor of Medicine and Bachelor of Surgery (MBBS) curriculum (2018),
 Establishment of the Jockey Club Centre for Clinical Innovation and Discovery and the Jockey Club Institute of Cancer Care at the redeveloped Grantham Hospital, supported by a HKD 1.24 billion donation from the Hong Kong Jockey Club (expected to open in 2025)
 Redevelopment of the Sassoon Road Medical Campus (expected to be completed in 2027).

In 2017, it was reported that Leung, together with Xiang Zhang from the University of California, Berkeley, were the final 2 candidates for the next HKU president. The Council of HKU, however, eventually selected Zhang.

Leung's tenure as dean was renewed in 2018 for a 5-year term until 2023.

Leung became the interim Director of the School of Public Health, after the former Director, Keiji Fukuda, retired in 2021.

Leung resigned as Dean in November 2021 to succeed Leong Cheung at the Hong Kong Jockey Club as the Executive Director (Charities and Community). He joined the Hong Kong Jockey Club on 1 August 2022.

Outside HKU, Leung was the founding chair of the Asia Pacific Observatory on Health Systems Policies from 2010 to 2014, an elected council member of the Hong Kong Academy of Medicine from 2012 to 2019,  the founding co-director of the World Health Organization Collaborating Centre for Infectious Disease Epidemiology and Control from 2014 to 2018, a member of the University Grants Committee from 2014 to 2019, a member of the Hospital Authority Board from 2013 to 2022, and a member of the Youth Development Commission of the Government of Hong Kong from 2018 to 2022. He is currently serving on the Steering Committee on Primary Healthcare Development of the Government of Hong Kong since 2017, the Board of Directors of the Laboratory of Data Discovery for Health at the Hong Kong Science Park since 2020, the board of governors of the Wellcome Trust since 2021, and the Global Health Risk Framework Commission.

During the COVID-19 pandemic, Leung is one of the experts advising the Chief Executive and the Government of Hong Kong, even after leaving HKU.

Academically, Leung was an editor for the Journal of Public Health between 2008 and 2013, the inaugural co-editor of Epidemics and an associate editor of Health Policy. He is currently the founding deputy editor-in-chief of China CDC Weekly, and a member of the editorial advisory board of The BMJ.

Leung is an ex-officio member of the Medical and Health Services subsector of the Election Committee of Hong Kong for the 2021-2026 term.

Research 
Leung founded and led the Infectious Disease Epidemiology Group during the SARS outbreak.

Leung's research involves several large-scale longitudinal studies, including Children of 1997, FAMILY and the Department of Health Elderly Health Service cohort.

Personal life 
Leung is a Roman Catholic.

Leung's interest in music stems from his mother, who taught music in Belilios Public School. He is the Principal Conductor of the Hong Kong University Philharmonic Orchestra (formerly the Hong Kong University Students' Union Philharmonic Orchestra), and an Honorary Guest Conductor at the Hong Kong Children's Symphony Orchestra, Previously, he sat on the board of governors of the Hong Kong Sinfonietta and the Hong Kong Philharmonic Orchestra (until 1 November 2018), the board of directors of the Asian Youth Orchestra, and the Performing Arts Committee of the West Kowloon Cultural District Authority.

Controversies 
Leung's move to the government in 2008 was controversial as HKU retained his professorship, and he held Canadian citizenship at the time. All Principal officials of Hong Kong, including the Secretaries for the Bureaux, must be filled by Chinese citizens without the right of abode in foreign countries. Although Under Secretaries for the Bureax were not a principal official, they may serve as Acting Secretaries when the Secretaries were unable to hold office. He eventually renounced his Canadian citizenship.

On a press conference about the COVID-19 pandemic on 25 January 2020, Leung and attending government officials asked the public to wear face masks but did not do so themselves. When asked why he did not wear a face mask, he claimed it would make him unable to speak. He was criticised and apologised the following day.

Awards and honours 
 Fellow of the Royal College of Physicians of Edinburgh
 Fellow of the Royal College of Physicians
 Honorary fellow of the Faculty of Public Health
 Official Justice of the Peace, Hong Kong (2008)
 Gold Bauhinia Star, Hong Kong (2012)
 Non-official Justice of the Peace, Hong Kong (2015)
 Member of the National Academy of Medicine (2018)

References 

1972 births
Alumni of the University of Hong Kong
Harvard University alumni
University of Western Ontario alumni
Hong Kong civil servants
Academic staff of the University of Hong Kong
Hong Kong medical doctors
Living people
Members of the National Academy of Medicine
People educated at Stonyhurst College
Deans (academic)
Hong Kong expatriates in the United Kingdom
Medical journal editors
Hong Kong expatriates in the United States
Hong Kong expatriates in Canada
Members of the Election Committee of Hong Kong, 2021–2026